Product information management (PIM) is the process of managing all the information required to market and sell products through distribution channels. This product data is created by an internal organization to support a multichannel marketing strategy. A central hub of product data can be used to distribute information to sales channels such as e-commerce websites, print catalogues, marketplaces such as Amazon and Google Shopping, social media platforms like Instagram and electronic data feeds to trading partners. Moreover, the significant role that PIM plays is reducing the abandonment rate by giving better product information.

PIM solutions are most relevant to business-to-consumer and business-to-business firms that sell products through a variety of sales channels in a range of industries. The use of PIM is generally influenced by a company's:

 wide array of products and/or complex product data set
 frequently changing product characteristics
 increasing number of sales channels
 non-uniform information technology infrastructure (plethora of data sources and formats)
 online business and electronic ordering
 various locales and localization requirements
 support SEO strategies of business

PIM manages customer-facing product data required to support multiple geographic locations, multilingual data, maintenance and modification of product information within a centralized product catalogue. PIM can act as a centralized hub for storing product information and from every channel. Product information kept by a business can be scattered throughout departments and held by employees or systems, instead of being available centrally; data may be saved in various formats, or only be available in hard copy form. It also helps businesses to improve their conversion rate optimization (CRO) by displaying consistent branding and reducing abandonment rate. Moreover, PIM allows the automation of most of the processes of product creation. All in all PIM provides a centralized solution for media independent product data maintenance, efficient data collection, data governance and output.

Synonyms and related terms

Product data management is the use of software or other tools to track and control information related to a particular product. The managed data usually involves the descriptions and technical specifications of a product.
Product resource management is used by some software providers as a synonym for PIM, as well as product content management, mainly popular as a term in England and France.
 Product life-cycle management refers more to a management strategy than to a specific information technology, the goal of which is to optimize the entire life cycle of a product from inception, through engineering design and manufacturing over time.
 Media asset management or digital asset management refers to the management of unstructured multimedia objects such as images, graphics and presentations as well as ‘meta-information’ (data about data). The term is used primarily in the media business.
 Cross media publishing comes from the print and advertising industries, referring to the coordinated use of multiple media in complementary fashion. It also denotes the repeat usage of individual structural elements such as text, images or graphics within different media.
 Product Information Management & Syndication, which stresses the need for capabilities to seamlessly disseminate product content through (online) sales channels.
Product experience management is a practice for a company to deliver customers an experience around its products or services throughout the customer lifecycle.
Item Master is another term used to refer to the technology that collects, organises and controls the product information within a company.

Catalog Management Systems is used by some software providers as synonym for PIM, especially in eProcurement industry

Technology and use
PIM systems consolidate all product information onto a single platform. It helps connect retailing and manufacturing channels to counter complex challenges in managing and maintaining product data quality. In terms of company information technology infrastructure, this means having a PIM platform running over or alongside a database with an application server, and/or XML-based exchange of product information. This forms a foundation upon which to build sales and procurement business processes. With PIM solutions, access and user authorizations for all database information, ordering processes linked with inventory management systems and the mechanisms for modular expansions are managed via a web-based administration interface.

Point of sales systems and online shopping platforms such as online marketplaces are based upon electronic catalogues. PIM systems can load descriptive product information as content into a catalogue management solution, where products are grouped and managed for specific target markets. Data exchange interface standards such as Open ICEcat allow seamless interchange of electronic catalogues between vendors on the one hand and purchasing firms and marketplace operators. E-procurement solutions are closely related, which automate the procurement process for purchasing goods and services. These create transparency for the product data of multiple vendors to support the centralized management of multi-supplier catalogues and facilitate price and quality research.

Data management systems are often not interoperable meaning that data exchange without PIM can lead to severe repercussions for a business. Some companies use master data management as an information technology resource in lieu of PIM. But master data management systems are not a business application and often lack usability, product data management capability including data enrichment, validation and workflow rules, which impact return on investment.

IDC, a technology research firm, published the "IDC MarketScape: Worldwide Product Information Management Applications for Commerce 2021 Vendor Assessment" in July 2021. It named Akeneo, EnterWorks, Informatica, inRiver, Riversand and Salsify as Leaders. Stibo Systems, Pimberly, Winshuttle, Pimcore, Saleslayer, Bluestone PIM, Syndigo and Via Medici were classified as Major Players. It evaluated the strengths, challenges, and considerations of each vendor for prospective customers.

G2.com, a leading listing and review platform, publishes seasonal reports and maintains a dynamic grid showcasing all the top PIM software that is available in the market. Some of the noted PIM software in the list include Plytix, Akeneo, PIMworks,Sales Layer etc. Also, the G2 grid is categorized into 4 parts: Leaders, Contenders, Niche, and High Performers. The software that is in the Leader Quadrant, like PIMworks, Akeneo,syndigo, sales layer, plytix are some of the best solutions that any e-commerce retailer can get their hands on. 

With the growth of e-commerce and "endless aisles" marketplaces, product content syndication platforms have emerged as an essential tool to distribute product content from suppliers to retailers. This service usually funded by the suppliers, to reduce the workload on their retailer customers, and ensure their products are presented well online. In each region, 1-2 organisations provide this service: USA - Salsify, Syndigo, Supplysail; UK - Brandbank/Nielsen; Europe - Alkemics; Australia/NZ - SKUvantage.

Link with enterprise content management

Enterprise content management is a term encompassing technologies, methods and tools used for gathering, imaging, storing, archiving and providing electronic content. Distinction can be made between four separate sub-areas. Document management systems are deployed for archiving, and product data management involves the management of structured, technical data for such applications as parts diagrams and lists. Content management systems are more commercially oriented and provide a framework for knowledge management or informational service offerings through the management of unstructured, document-type content. PIM systems are used to manage structured data in a business context for feeding into any kind of distribution channel, from electronic catalogues to online shops to print catalogues.

See also 
 Identity resolution
 Open Icecat

References

Product management